Tetrahydroharmine (THH) is a fluorescent indole alkaloid that occurs in the tropical liana species Banisteriopsis caapi.

THH, like other harmala alkaloids in B. caapi, namely harmaline and harmine, is a reversible inhibitor of monoamine oxidase A (RIMA), but it also inhibits the reuptake of serotonin.

THH contributes to B. caapi's psychoactivity as a serotonin reuptake inhibitor.

Legal Status

Australia
Harmala alkaloids are considered Schedule 9 prohibited substances under the Poisons Standard (October 2015). A Schedule 9 substance is a substance which may be abused or misused, the manufacture, possession, sale or use of which should be prohibited by law except when required for medical or scientific research, or for analytical, teaching or training purposes with approval of Commonwealth and/or State or Territory Health Authorities.

See also 
 Ayahuasca
 Coronaridine

References

Further reading 
 

Beta-Carbolines
Tryptamine alkaloids
Serotonin reuptake inhibitors